The Honduras national under-20 football team is the national under-20 association football team of Honduras. They have made nine FIFA U-20 World Cup appearances.

Tournament history

Current squad
The following 20 players were named to the squad for the 2022 CONCACAF U-20 Championship.

Caps and goals are updated as of 28 June 2022, after the match against Panama.

Top goalscorers

Record v other nations
 As of 28 June 2022
 Includes data from  FIFA U-20 World Cup, CONCACAF Under-20 Championship and UNCAF U-19 Tournament only

List of coaches
List of managers since 1956 to present:

 1956 — José Santos
 1958–62 — Mario Griffin
 1964 — Hermes Bertrand
 1976–77 — Rodolfo Godoy
 1978 — Ángel Rodríguez
 1980 — Carlos Cruz
 1982 — Néstor Matamala
 1984 — Mario Griffin
 1988 — Carlos Suazo
 1990 — Jorge Cabrera
 1991 — Dennis Allen
 1992 — José Ortiz
 1994–95 — Luis Paz
 1996 — Carlos Cruz
 1998–99 — Rubén Gifarro
 1999 — José Herrera
 2000 — Marco Calderón
 2001 — Hernán García
 2002 — Óscar Salgado
 2004–06 — Rubén Gifarro
 2007–08 — Miguel Escalante
 2008–09 — Emilio Umanzor
 2010–14 — Javier Padilla
 2014–15 — Jorge Jiménez
 2016–19 — Carlos Tábora
 2022–Present — Luis Alvarado

Honours
 CONCACAF Under-20 Championship
 Winners (2): 1982, 1994
 Runners-up (3): 1964, 1976, 2017
 3rd place (2): 1978, 2009

References

Under-20
Central American national under-20 association football teams